The Pacific snake eel (Ophichthus triserialis, also known as the spotted snake eel in the United States) is an eel in the family Ophichthidae (worm/snake eels). It was described by Johann Jakob Kaup in 1856, originally under the genus Muraenopsis. It is a marine, subtropical eel which is known from the eastern central and southeastern Pacific Ocean, including California, USA, Peru, the Gulf of California, Mexico, the Galapagos Islands, Colombia, Ecuador, Costa Rica, El Salvador, Honduras, Guatemala, Nicaragua, and Panama.

The species epithet "triserialis" means "three-rowed" in Latin, and refers to the eel's spotted pattern. The Pacific snake-eel's diet consists of bony fish, shrimp and bivalves. It is frequently captured as a by-catch by shrimp trawlers, but is usually discarded.

Due to its wide distribution, lack of known threats, and lack of observed population decline, the IUCN redlist lists the Pacific snake eel as Least Concern.

References

Fish described in 1856
Taxa named by Johann Jakob Kaup
Ophichthus